Dijon Prioleau (born December 19, 1992), known as Dijon, is an American gospel singer.

Personal life
Dijon was born in Columbia, South Carolina, to Kim Cohen and Daryl Prioleau. He has four siblings: Adonia Prioleau, Kimberly Adams, Jalen Clouds, Jaron Prioleau and one stepbrother: DequinDre Adams by his stepmother: Kiesha Prioleau. His biological parents divorced when Dijon was at a very young age. Dijon attended Fairfield Middle School in Winnsboro, South Carolina. He was 14 years old when he was discovered by Todd (Boogie) Muhammad after an audition in Columbia, South Carolina, and he was later signed to Kollosul Entertainment/Zomba Gospel. On August 7, 2007 he released his first album "A Kid's Point of View".

Discography

Albums
A Kid's Point of View (2007)
Christian Book link
Amazon link

Singles
"A Kid's Point of View"
"He Is Lord"
"Real Love (Dijon song)"

Reviews 
SoulTracks review of From a Kids Point of View
Gospel Flava Album Review

References
CCM Magazine of Dijon Biography
[ Biography of Dijon]

External links
Dijon Official Myspace
Zomba Gospel Group Official Myspace
Verity Records Official Website

1992 births
Living people
Musicians from Columbia, South Carolina
21st-century American singers
21st-century American male singers